Bulle Ogier (born Marie-France Thielland; 9 August 1939) is a French actress and screenwriter. She adopted the professional surname Ogier, which was her mother's maiden name. Her first appearance on screen was in Voilà l'Ordre, a short film directed by Jacques Baratier with a number of the then-emerging young singers of the 1960s in France, including Boris Vian, Claude Nougaro, etc.

She worked with Jacques Rivette (L'amour fou, Céline et Julie vont en bateau, Duelle, Le Pont du Nord, La Bande des Quatre), Luis Buñuel (Le charme discret de la bourgeoisie), Alain Tanner (La Salamandre), René Allio, Claude Lelouch, Jean-Paul Civeyrac (All the Fine Promises Prix Jean Vigo), Marguerite Duras, Rainer Werner Fassbinder, Barbet Schroeder, and others.

Ogier was awarded the Prix Suzanne Bianchetti in 1972.

Family life
Ogier is married to producer and director Barbet Schroeder. She had a daughter, Pascale (1958–1984), who adopted her mother's professional surname "Ogier" and was also an actress.

Selected filmography

 L'Amour fou (1969, by Jacques Rivette) – Claire
 Paulina s'en va (1969, by André Téchiné) - Paulina
 Les Stances à Sophie (Sophie's Ways (1970, by Moshé Mizrahi)
 Out 1 : Noli me tangere (1971, by Jacques Rivette) – Pauline/Emilie
 Rendez-vous a Bray (1971, by André Delvaux) – Odile
 La Salamandre (1971, by Alain Tanner)
 Out 1 : Spectre (1971, by Jacques Rivette) – Pauline/Emilie
 La Vallée (1972, by Barbet Schroeder) – Vivian 
 Le charme discret de la bourgeoisie (1972, by Luis Buñuel)
 Io e lui (1973, by Luciano Salce) – Irene
 La Paloma (1974, by Daniel Schmid) – La mère d'Isidore
 Céline et Julie vont en bateau (1974, by Jacques Rivette) – Camille
 Un divorce heureux (1975, by Henning Carlsen) – Marguerite
 Maîtresse (1975, by Barbet Schroeder) – Ariane
 Duelle (1976, by Jacques Rivette) – Viva
 Surreal Estate (1976, by Eduardo de Gregorio) - Ariane
 The Third Generation (1979, by Rainer Werner Fassbinder) – Hilde Krieger
 Le Pont du Nord (1981, by Jacques Rivette) – Marie
 Aspern (1984, by Eduardo de Gregorio) – Mlle Tita
 Tricheurs (1984, by Barbet Schroeder) – Suzie
 Mon cas (1986, by Manoel de Oliveira) – Actrice n° 1
 Candy Mountain (1987, by Robert Frank) – Cornelia
 The Distant Land (1987, by Luc Bondy) – Genia
 La Bande des quatre (1988, by Jacques Rivette) – Constance
 Don't Forget You're Going to Die (1995, by Xavier Beauvois) – Benoît's mother
 Le Fils de Gascogne (1995, by Pascal Aubier)
 Irma Vep (1995, by Olivier Assayas) – Mireille
 Au coeur du mensonge (1998, by Claude Chabrol) – Yveline Bordier
Somewhere in the City (1998, by Ramin Niami) – Brigitte
 Venus Beauty Institute (Vénus beauté (institut)) (1998, by Tonie Marshall) – Madame Nadine
 Shattered Image (1998, by Raoul Ruiz) – Mrs. Ford
 Stolen Life (1998, by Yves Angelo) – The woman in cemetery
 The Color of Lies (1999, by Claude Chabrol) – Évelyne Bordier
 La Confusion des Genres (2000, by Ilan Duran Cohen) – Mère de Laurence
 Deux (2001, by Werner Schroeter) – Anna
 All the Fine Promises (2002, by Jean-Paul Civeyrac) – Béatrice
 Merci Docteur Rey (2002, by Andrew Litvack) – Claude Sabrié
 Seaside (2002, by Julie Lopes-Curval) – Rose
 Good Girl (2005)
 Belle Toujours (2006, by Manoel de Oliveira)
 The Duchess of Langeais (2007, by Jacques Rivette) – Princesse de Blamont-Chauvry
 Let's Dance (Faut que ça danse!) (2007) – Geneviève Bellinsky
 Passe-passe (2008, by Tonie Marshall) – Madeleine
 Wandering Streams (2010) – Lucie
 Chantrapas (2010) – Catherine
 Boomerang (2015, by François Favrat) – Blanche Rey
 Encore heureux (2016, by Benoît Graffin) – Louise
 Capitaine Marleau (2016, by Josée Dayan) – Katel Meyer (1 Episode)
 Wonders in the Suburbs (2019, by Jeanne Balibar) – Delphine Souriceau
 Both Sides of the Blade (2022, by Claire Denis) – Nelly

References

External links

 

1939 births
Living people
People from Boulogne-Billancourt
French film actresses
French stage actresses
French television actresses
French women screenwriters
French screenwriters
20th-century French actresses
21st-century French actresses
Prix Médicis essai winners
Signatories of the 1971 Manifesto of the 343